The Kir royal is a French cocktail, a variation on the Kir. It consists of crème de cassis topped with champagne, rather than the white wine used in traditional Kir. This apéritif is typically served in a flute glass.

References

Cocktails with Champagne
Cocktails with liqueur